Peeter Lepp (born 1 July 1943) is an Estonian politician. From 1993 to 2002, he was a member of the Estonian Coalition Party. After its dissolution, he joined the Estonian Reform Party.

He was a member of the Tallinn town council from 1996 to 1999 and was the head of Põhja-Tallinn (north Tallinn) district. He was the mayor of Tallinn for 8 months in 1999.

References

External links
 Peeter Lepp in Estonian

1943 births
Living people
Mayors of Tallinn
Estonian Reform Party politicians
Estonian Coalition Party politicians
20th-century Estonian politicians
21st-century Estonian politicians